Reuben Morgan-Williams (born 3 February 1998) is a Welsh rugby union player who plays for Ospreys regional team as a scrum-half. He is a Wales under-20 international.

Career 
Morgan-Williams came through the Ospreys development pathway, beginning his career with feeder club Neath Athletic RFC.

Morgan-Williams made his debut for the Ospreys on 2 September 2017, coming off the bench in the win over Zebre. Morgan-Williams previously played for the Ospreys academy and Neath RFC.

A Wales U20 international, Morgan-Williams was part of the Grand Slam winning squad in the 2016 Six Nations Under 20s Championship.

In 2019, Morgan-Williams made his sevens debut, featuring for Wales in the World Rugby Sevens Series.

References

External links 
Ospreys Player Profile

Rugby union players from Neath
Welsh rugby union players
Ospreys (rugby union) players
Living people
1998 births
Rugby union scrum-halves